Filzip is a freeware file archiver program for the Microsoft Windows platform.

It was written by Philipp Engel. While free, the author does request donations to help the cost of development and reward him for his work. As of March 2019, no new version has been released since version 3.0.6. Filzip has been presumed unmaintained the software development.

Features 
The program has been localized to more than twenty languages.

Filzip supports seven different archive formats, allowing the user to add and extract files from the archives. These include ZIP, BH, CAB, JAR, LHA (LZH), TAR, and gzip. A handful of other formats are supported for extraction only, including ACE, ARC, ARJ, RAR, and ZOO.

Files within most formats can be viewed without explicitly unpacking them, and can be removed or renamed within the archive. ZIP files may be spanned; that is, written to any number of files with a fixed maximum size so that they can be placed on removable media.

The program has integration, and can create self-extracting executable archives for redistribution without licensing fees.

Reception 
CNET rated it 4/5 stars and wrote, "Easy program operation sets this freeware file compression tool apart from the crowded genre."

See also 
 Comparison of file archivers
 Comparison of archive formats
 List of archive formats
 ZIP (file format)

References

External links 
 
 File compression review including Filzip
 Review of Filzip at DonationCoder.com

Windows-only freeware
Windows compression software
Data compression software
File archivers
Pascal (programming language) software